is a Japanese TV actress and former pink film actress.

Life and career
Asami made her onscreen debut in a small role in Teruo Ishii's  released in October 1979 by Toei. She primarily rose to prominence in six Nikkatsu Roman Porno films in the period 1983–1984. In the 1983 Roman porno Erotic Confessions, she played the role of a farmer's daughter stranded with a group of sex hungry travelers by a flood in this Edo period historical film by Shōgorō Nishimura. In the 1984 White Uniform Story: Molestation!, Asami plays a nurse brutalized by a psychotic patient. According to film critics Thomas and Yuko Weisser, she "plays a wide-eyed perky virgin impeccably". In her final film for Nikkatsu, Asami starred in the improbable College Girls' Dormitory vs Nurse School Students' Dormitory, which the Weissers call pleasant but "ultimately very dumb".

Moving into mainstream film, Asami had a small role in the June 1986 costume drama/comedy . More notable was her taking on the dual roles of twin sisters Princess Ial and Princess Igam in the Super Sentai tokusatsu TV series Hikari Sentai Maskman which ran in 51 episodes from February 1987 to February 1988.

Nikkatsu filmography
 , (April 1983) Kōyū Ohara
 , (June 1983), directed by Shōgorō Nishimura
 , (September 1983), directed by Masaru Konuma
 , (March 1984), directed by Hidehirō Itō
 , (June 1984), directed by Shōgorō Nishimura
 , (September 1984), directed by Nobuyuki Saitō

References

External links 
 
 

1958 births
Japanese actresses
Pink film actors
Living people
People from Saitama (city)